The Sacred Books of the East is a monumental 50-volume set of English translations of Asian religious texts, edited by Max Müller and published by the Oxford University Press between 1879 and 1910. It incorporates the essential sacred texts of Hinduism, Buddhism, Taoism, Confucianism, Zoroastrianism, Jainism, and Islam.

All of the books are in the public domain in the United States, and most or all are in the public domain in many other countries. Electronic versions of all 50 volumes are widely available online.

References

External links

Sacred Books of the East on archive.org
Sacred Books of the East, at sacred-texts.com (html)
Sacred Books of the East, PDF ebooks at holybooks.com

Book series introduced in 1879
Series of books
Translations into English
Oxford University Press books
Books about Asia